Fissures is a 2009  Moroccan film directed by Hicham Ayouch.

Synopsis 
In the crazy city of Tangiers three people on the margins of society looking for love and deliverance will come together and find love with one another: Abdelsellem, a man who breaks out of prison, Noureddine, his best friend, and Marcela, a Brazilian fantasist, excessive and suicidal.

Response 
The film received critical acclaim in France.

Awards 
 Festival Nacional de Tánger 2010

References

External links 

 

2009 films
Moroccan drama films